The large moth family Gelechiidae contains the following genera:

Ochmastis
Octonodula
Oecocecis
Oegoconoides
Oestomorpha
Oncerozancla
Onebala
Opacochroa
Ophiolechia
Organitis
Origo
Ornativalva
Orsotricha
Orthoptila
Oxylechia
Oxypteryx

References

 Natural History Museum Lepidoptera genus database

Gelechiidae
Gelechiid